Louis Édouard Lapicque (1 August 1866 – 6 December 1952) was a French neuroscientist, socialist activist, antiboulangist, dreyfusard and freemason who was very influential in the early 20th century.  One of his main contributions was to propose the integrate-and-fire model of the neuron in a seminal article published in 1907.  Today, this model of the neuron is still one of the most popular models in computational neuroscience for both cellular and neural networks studies, as well as in mathematical neuroscience because of its simplicity.  A review article  was published for the centenary of the original Lapicque's 1907 paper - this review also contains an English translation of the original paper.

His wife, Marcelle Lapicque, was also a neurophysiologist. Louis Lapicque "insisted on the importance of his wife as equal co-worker in all his research".

Works 
 Notice on titles and scientific works of Louis Lapicque (1908)
 Excitability function of time, chronaxie, its meaning and its measure (1926)
 Nervous machine (1943)
 Neuromuscular isochronism and rythmogenic excitability (1947)
 On reaction times according to races and social conditions (1901)
 Quantitative research on nervous electrical excitation treated like a polarization (1907)
 Consciousness as a cellular function (1952)

See also 
 Chronaxie

References

External links
Guide to the Louis Lapicque Papers
Louis Lapicque Papers in UTHSCSA Digital Archives

1866 births
French Freemasons
1952 deaths
People from Épinal
French neuroscientists
French physiologists
Members of the French Academy of Sciences